Gordon Dines (1911–1982) was a British cinematographer. Dines worked for many years at Ealing Studios, photographing films such as The Blue Lamp (1950).

Selected filmography
 Feather Your Nest (1937)
 Keep Fit (1937)
 Penny Paradise (1938)
 The Gaunt Stranger (1938)
 It's in the Air (1938)
 Let's Be Famous (1939)
 Turned Out Nice Again (1941)
 Nicholas Nickleby (1947)
 Frieda (1947)
 The Blue Lamp (1950)
 Pool of London (1951)
 Secret People (1952)
 The Gentle Gunman (1952)
 The Cruel Sea (1953)
 The Square Ring (1953)
 The Crowded Day (1954)
 The Colditz Story (1955)
 The Long Arm (1956)
 The Lady Is a Square (1959)
 A Circle of Deception (1960)

References

Bibliography
 Spicer, Andrew.  Typical Men: The Representation of Masculinity in Popular British Cinema. I.B.Tauris, 2003.

External links

1911 births
1982 deaths
British cinematographers
Film people from London